Events from the year 1844 in the United Kingdom.

Incumbents
 Monarch – Victoria
 Prime Minister – Robert Peel (Conservative)
 Foreign Secretary – George Hamilton-Gordon, 4th Earl of Aberdeen 
 Parliament – 14th

Events

 28 February – the Grand National at Aintree is won by the 5/1 joint favourite Discount.
 11 April – initiation of the Ragged Schools Union.
 11 May – major fire at Lyme Regis.
 May – Henry Hardinge, 1st Viscount Hardinge, appointed as Governor-General of India.
 6 June – George Williams founds the Young Men's Christian Association (YMCA) in London.
 15 June – Factory Act imposes a maximum 12-hour working day for women, and a maximum 6-hour day for children aged 6 to 13.
 19 July – Bank Charter Act restricts powers of British banks other than the Bank of England to issue banknotes of the pound sterling.
 21 & 27 August – consecration of two new major urban Roman Catholic churches, both designed by Augustus Pugin, which will in the 1850s be elevated to cathedral status: St Mary's Church, Newcastle upon Tyne and St Barnabas Church, Nottingham. (In October, Pugin occupies The Grange, Ramsgate, a house designed for himself which is influential in the development of domestic Gothic Revival architecture.)
 28 September – a blackdamp explosion at Haswell Colliery in the Durham Coalfield kills 95, with just four survivors.
 8 October – Louis-Phillipe, King of the French, arrives in Portsmouth on a visit to Britain.
 20 October – Counties (Detached Parts) Act 1844 comes into effect, eliminating many outliers or exclaves of counties in England and Wales for civil purposes.
 28 October – the Royal Exchange in London opened by Queen Victoria.
 11 December – Health of Towns Association formed to press for public health improvements.
 21 December – the Rochdale Pioneers, usually considered the first successful cooperative enterprise, open their store in Rochdale, forming the basis for the modern cooperative movement.

Undated
 Winsford rock salt mine opens in Cheshire; by 2014 it will be Britain's oldest working mine.
 Ring of bells installed at St John the Evangelist's Church, Kirkham (Lancashire), said to be the first peal rung in an English Roman Catholic church since the Reformation.
 "Surplice riots" in Exeter and London break out in opposition to supposed Catholicisation of the Church of England.
 King Frederick Augustus II of Saxony makes an informal summer tour of Britain.

Publications
 Robert Chambers' anonymous Vestiges of the Natural History of Creation, which paves the way for acceptance of Darwin's The Origin of Species.
 Charles Dickens' novel Martin Chuzzlewit (complete in book form) and his Christmas novella The Chimes.
 Benjamin Disraeli's novel Coningsby.
 Henry Fox Talbot's book The Pencil of Nature, the first illustrated with photographs from a camera (publication commences June).
 William Makepeace Thackeray's novel The Luck of Barry Lyndon (serialisation).

Births
 3 May – Richard D'Oyly Carte, theatrical impresario (died 1901)
 22 July – William Archibald Spooner, scholar and Anglican priest (died 1930)
 28 July – Gerard Manley Hopkins, English poet (died 1889)
 6 August – Alfred, Duke of Saxe-Coburg and Gotha, second son of Queen Victoria (died 1900)
 29 August – Edward Carpenter, socialist poet (died 1929)
 23 October – Robert Bridges, English poet (died 1930)
 25 October – Arthur William à Beckett, journalist (died 1909)

Deaths
 23 January – Sir Francis Burdett, politician (born 1770)
 15 February – Henry Addington, 1st Viscount Sidmouth, Prime Minister of the United Kingdom (born 1757)
 6 March – George Meikle Kemp, architect (born 1795)
 3 April – Edward Bigge, Archdeacon of Lindisfarne (born 1807)
 27 July – John Dalton, chemist and physicist (born 1766)
 23 November – Thomas Henderson, Scottish astronomer (born 1798)
 25 November – Sir Augustus Callcott, landscape painter (born 1779)

See also
 1844 in Scotland

References

 
Years of the 19th century in the United Kingdom